Gyula Molnár (born 17 August 1961) is a Hungarian politician who was the leader of the Hungarian Socialist Party between 2016 and 2018. He was a Member of Parliament from 1994 to 2010 and from 2018 to 2022, and also served as Mayor of Újbuda (the eleventh, and most populous,  district of Budapest) from 2002 to 2010.

Personal life
He is married to Dr. Rózsa Bóta; together they have two sons, Gergely and Gábor Milán.

References

1961 births
Living people
Hungarian Socialist Party politicians
Democratic Coalition (Hungary) politicians
Members of the National Assembly of Hungary (1994–1998)
Members of the National Assembly of Hungary (1998–2002)
Members of the National Assembly of Hungary (2002–2006)
Members of the National Assembly of Hungary (2006–2010)
Members of the National Assembly of Hungary (2018–2022)
Mayors of places in Hungary
Politicians from Budapest